Moslem Mojademi (born 6 July 1996) is an Iranian professional footballer midfielder for Persian Gulf Pro League club Naft Masjed Soleyman.

Club career

Sanat Naft Abadan

He made his debut for Sanat Naft (in Persian Gulf Pro League) on December 2, 2016 against Siah Jamegan as a starter.

Career statistics

References

External links
 
 Moslem Mojademi on Instagram 
Moslem Mojademi at Persian League
Moslem Mojademi  at metafootball 
Moslem mojademi  at Soccerway  

1996 births
Living people
People from Shadegan
Iranian footballers
Association football midfielders
Sanat Naft Abadan F.C. players
Muaither SC players
Paykan F.C. players
Naft Masjed Soleyman F.C. players
Azadegan League players
Persian Gulf Pro League players
Qatari Second Division players
Iranian expatriate footballers
Expatriate footballers in Qatar
Iranian expatriate sportspeople in Qatar
Sportspeople from Khuzestan province